Providence Christian College is a private Christian liberal arts college in Pasadena, California. Founded in 2002, it is an independent, confessionally Reformed college with no formal denominational ties. The college offers only one degree program, a bachelor's degree in Liberal Studies.

History
On several occasions, as early as the 1960s, discussions were held about establishing a Reformed Christian College on the West Coast. In November 2001 a small group met in Chino, California to consider the feasibility of such a college, and unanimously agreed to establish a quality four-year liberal arts program that would in all aspects of its life and learning seek to reflect a Reformed Biblical perspective.

The group also agreed that the college should be governed by a self-perpetuating Board of Directors drawn from various Reformed and Presbyterian churches. The college has no denominational affiliation, but does hold to Presbyterian and Reformed confessional standards (the Westminster Confession and Catechisms, the Belgic Confession, the Heidelberg Catechism, and the Canons of Dort).

Providence Christian College was incorporated in the state of California on November 12, 2002, and the first board meeting was held on January 18, 2003. On January 1, 2004, Providence took full possession of a campus in Ontario, California, and began renovating its five main buildings into classrooms, dorms, a library, a dining hall, and administrative offices.

Accreditation
Providence Christian College is accredited by the WASC Senior College and University Commission

In 2004 PCC started the accreditation process and was granted permission to operate as a degree granting institution in the state of California on December 9, 2004, by the Bureau for Private Post-Secondary and Vocational Education (BPPVE). Immediately following approval by the BPPVE, Providence Christian College began the process of seeking eligibility by Western Association of Schools and Colleges (WASC). The college is also a member of IAPCHE: the International Association for the Promotion of Christian Higher Education.

Facilities
In August 2010, Providence moved from Ontario, California to Pasadena, California. The Providence Christian College library holds approximately 12,000 volumes and 100 periodical subscriptions, with student access to an additional 5,500 online periodicals (many full text), 2,500 electronic books, 52 other scholarly databases through online subscriptions.

The college resided on the campus of William Carey International University, which it also shares with the U.S. Center for World Mission. The 17.5-acre residential college campus sits in the East Washington Village neighborhood on the north side of Pasadena, California, in close proximity to the foothills of the San Gabriel Mountains and the Angeles National Forest. In January 2019, Providence Christian College moved again, this time into a church building and its adjoining offices in Old Town Pasadena right next to Fuller Theological Seminary.

Athletics
The Providence Christian athletic teams are called the Sea Beggars. The college is a member of the National Association of Intercollegiate Athletics (NAIA), primarily competing in the California Pacific Conference (Cal Pac) since the 2015–16 academic year. They are also a member of the National Christian College Athletic Association (NCCAA), primarily competing as an independent in the West Region of the Division I level.

Providence Christian includes ten intercollegiate varsity sports: Men's sports include baseball, cross country, golf, soccer, softball and track & field (outdoor); while women's sports include cross country, golf, soccer, track & field (outdoor) and volleyball.

References

External links
 Official website
 Official athletics website

Schools accredited by the Western Association of Schools and Colleges
Universities and colleges in Los Angeles County, California
Educational institutions established in 2005
Reformed universities and colleges
Unaccredited Christian universities and colleges in the United States
2005 establishments in California
California Pacific Conference schools
Private universities and colleges in California
Liberal arts colleges in California